Whitmer Peninsula is a broad ice-capped peninsula, about 7 nautical miles (13 km) long and wide, between Cheetham Ice Tongue and Harbord Glacier Tongue on the coast of Victoria Land. Mapped by United States Geological Survey (USGS) from surveys and U.S. Navy air photos, 1957–62. Named by Advisory Committee on Antarctic Names (US-ACAN) for Lieutenant (j.g.) R.D. Whitmer, U.S. Navy, who wintered over at Williams Field, McMurdo Sound, in 1956. He returned to Antarctica with U.S. Naval Construction Battalion units during Deep Freeze 1966 and 1967.

Peninsulas of Antarctica
Landforms of Victoria Land
Scott Coast